The 2003–04 St. Francis Terriers men's basketball team represented St. Francis College during the 2003–04 NCAA Division I men's basketball season. The team was coached by Ron Ganulin, who was in his thirteenth year at the helm of the St. Francis Terriers. The Terrier's home games were played at the  Generoso Pope Athletic Complex. The team has been a member of the Northeast Conference since 1981.

The Terriers participated in their first NIT Season Tip-Off tournament, losing in the first round to Massachusetts 58–80. The Terriers proceeded to finish the season at 15–13 overall and 12–6 in conference play, to tie for the Conference Regular Season Championship with Monmouth. This is the second Regular Season Championship for the Terriers, the last one coming in the 2000–01 season.

Roster

Schedule and results

|-
!colspan=12 style="background:#0038A8; border: 2px solid #CE1126;;color:#FFFFFF;"| Regular season

|-
!colspan=12 style="background:#0038A8; border: 2px solid #CE1126;;color:#FFFFFF;"| 2004 NEC tournament

References

St. Francis Brooklyn Terriers men's basketball seasons
St. Francis
2003 in sports in New York City
2004 in sports in New York City